La Clairière de Vaux, also known as Milieu libre de Vaux or the Vaux Colony, was an early 1900s intentional community in Essômes-sur-Marne, northeastern France. It was the country's first anarchist commune.

References 

 Jean Maitron, Milieux libres in Le mouvement anarchiste en France, de 1914 à nos jours, tome 1, Paris, Gallimard, 1992, pp. 382-408.
 Michel Ragon, Milieu libre in Dictionnaire de l'Anarchie, Albin Michel, 2008.
 Léo Campion,  : les Maillons libertaires de la Chaîne d'Union, Éditions , 1996.
 Tony Legendre, Expériences de vie communautaire anarchiste en France - Le milieu libre de Vaux et la colonie naturiste de Bascon (Aisne), Éditions Libertaires, 2006, .
 Georges Narrat, Milieux libres, quelques essais contemporains de vie communiste en France, Paris, Félix Alcan, 1908, .
 , Communes Libertaire et Anarchiste en France, in Essais utopiques libertaires de « petite » dimension, Laboratoire Urbanisme Insurrectionnel, 2005.
 

Anarchist intentional communities